Atlántico railway station is a railway station and historic building located in San José, Costa Rica, declared as Architectural Patrimony of Costa Rica by decree 11664-C of 29 July 1980. 

Built in 1908 and open until 1996, it was the main railway station between San José and Limón, where the main freight port is located. 

The emblematic building combines victorian, neoclassical, and baroque architectures, with some modernist details. 

In 2011, a restoration effort by the Ministry of Culture and Youth took place to reopen the station as a railway station for the urban train between the cantons of San José, Alajuela, Cartago, and Heredia.

Shapes, Spaces, and Sounds Museum
Between 2002 and 2008, the station was the location of the Shapes, Spaces, and Sounds Museum. The museum closed in October 2007.

See also
Rail transport in Costa Rica
Interurbano Line
List of museums in Costa Rica

References

Rail transport in Costa Rica
Museums in San José, Costa Rica
Art museums and galleries in Costa Rica
Museums established in 2002
Museo de Formas Espacios y Sonidos
Atlántico railway station